Christian Friedrich von Kahlbutz (1651 – 1702) was a German knight, who is today most famous because of the state of preservation of his body; no noticeable mummification process was used upon his death.  Today the preserved corpse is a tourist attraction.

Background 

Kahlbutz was born in Kampehl, Brandenburg.

According to local legend, "Knight Kalebuz," as he was known, frequently exercised the right of droit du seigneur.  He had eleven children of his own and at least thirty other illegitimate children.  While exercising this "right" in July 1690, he chose the bride of a shepherd from Bückwitz.  She refused him and because of the laws governing the right of first night, he murdered the shepherd. Although there were no witnesses, the shepherd's bride, Maria Leppin, accused Kahlbutz of the murder and took him to court in Dreetz (Brandenburg).  As an aristocrat he had special rights and could swear an oath of innocence before the court in order to free himself.  Kahlbutz did this and was immediately acquitted.

Kahlbutz died in Kampehl at the age of 52 and was laid to rest in a double coffin in the family tomb.  In 1783 the last of the von Kahlbutz line died.  While the church of Kampehl was being renovated in 1794 the coffins in the church were going to be buried in the cemetery like all the other coffins.  When the coffins were opened it was discovered that all of the corpses except that of the Knight Kahlbutz had decayed.

Legend 
The local populace quickly found an explanation for the Mummy of the Knight of Kahlbutz.  They said that it was God's punishment for the murder of the shepherd.  It had been said that Kahlbutz had sworn before the court, "It was not I, otherwise after my death my body will not decay".

Natural mummification 

Several tests have been done on the mummy of the knight to figure out why a body that apparently was not embalmed has not undergone the natural decay process.  In the 1890s, Rudolf Virchow and Ferdinand Sauerbruch tested the mummy as did Charité, the largest university hospital in Europe, but all without success.  It remains a mystery as to why Kahlbutz's corpse has not decayed, but there are a few other similar cases where the natural decay process has not affected the individual.

The natural decay process of a corpse can be stopped or retarded under certain circumstances, in which the corpse becomes leathery.  Air conditions surrounding the body as well as the condition of the ground in which it is buried are most often contributing factors.  Absolute dryness, local radioactivity, or other ground factors such as acidity or salts.  Also hermetically sealed coffins without steadily moving air can contribute.  Likewise, a small ingestion of poisonous medicines, i.e. very small quantities innocuous to an individual, during one's lifetime can aid in the mummification process after death.  These kinds of substances are not readily detectable long after death though since the fat and water in the corpse changes and evaporates over time.

Today it is accepted that Kahlbutz suffered from some kind of illness, which caused an emaciation of his body.  Possible diseases that he suffered from are cancer, muscular dystrophy, and tuberculosis.  There is evidence that he did in fact suffer from the latter.  According to several sources, Kahlbutz suffocated on his own blood, which suggests that shortly before his death he lost a great deal of blood.  After his death he was buried in an oak double coffin.  Bodily decay may have been prevented by the fact that prior to being hermetically sealed in the coffin, he had lost a great deal of blood, in combination with the lack of soil containing decay-accelerating materials.

See also
 Incorruptibility, a property of the bodies of certain saints which, though not mummified, have not decayed

References
 A.C. Aufderheide: The geography of mummies. – In: A.C. Aufderheide (ed.): The Scientific Study of Mummies. Cambridge University Press, Cambridge 2003. p.: 170.

External links
 City of Kampehl

This article is based on a translation of an article from the German Wikipedia.

1651 births
1702 deaths
People from the Margraviate of Brandenburg
German untitled nobility
Mummies